Frank Mat(t)hews may refer to:
Frank Matthews (footballer) (1902–1981), English footballer
Frank Matthews (drug trafficker) (born 1940), drug trafficker
Frank C. Matthews (born 1972), African-American writer of urban fiction
Frank Matthews (Tracy Beaker)
Frank Matthews, character in 31 North 62 East
Frank A. Mathews Jr. (1890–1964), American Republican Party politician from New Jersey
Frank Matthews (cricketer) (1892–1961), English cricketer

See also
Francis Matthews (disambiguation)